Finding 8 is an outdoor game show by Singapore's MediaCorp Channel 8. It debuted on July 7, 2014. There are four main hosts: Kym Ng, Lee Teng, Quan Yi Fong and Ben Yeo. It is similar to the Korean variety show Running Man.

In each episode, guests join the four hosts e.g. Vivian Lai and Guo Liang. There are missions to complete, upon which competitors receive a clue on "8", which might be a person or an object. The first person who finds 8 will receive a $1000 shopping voucher and a secret weapon. The secret weapon (神秘力量) may be used in the following episode to help the host win.

Episodes

External links
Official Website

2014 Singaporean television series debuts
Singaporean game shows
Channel 8 (Singapore) original programming